The 1958–59 European Cup was the fourth season of the European Cup, Europe's premier club football tournament. The competition was won by Real Madrid for the fourth time in a row, who beat Reims 2–0 in the final at Neckarstadion, Stuttgart, on 3 June 1959. The two finalists also competed in the final of the first European Cup in 1956.

It was the first time that a team from Finland participated. Olympiakos, Greece's first ever entrants, withdrew for political reasons before playing their first tie. Spain continued to be represented by its runners-up, as its champions Real Madrid had already qualified as holders. This is the first time that Rapid Wien and AGF Aarhus failed to qualify for the tournament, while Standard Liége, Heart of Midlothian, Beșiktaș, NK Dinamo Zagreb, Jeunesse Esch, IFK Göteborg, Ards, Petrolul Ploiești, Atlético Madrid, Drumcondra, Polonia Bytom, KB, Schalke 04, Juventus Turin, Wiener Sportclub, Helsingin Palloseura, Wolverhampton Wanderers and DOS made their debut in competition.

Preliminary round
The draw for the preliminary round took place in Cannes, France, on Wednesday, 2 July 1958. As title holders, Real Madrid received a bye, and the remaining 27 teams were grouped geographically into three pots. The first drawn team in each pot also received byes, while the remaining clubs would play the preliminary round in September.

The calendar was decided by the involved teams, with all matches to be played by 30 September.

|}
Note: Real Madrid, Wolverhampton Wanderers, CDNA Sofia and HPS received byes.

1 Olympiacos withdrew due to international political issues, refusing to play in Istanbul following the long-standing tension between Turkey and Greece.

2 UEFA invited Manchester United to enter the competition after eight of the club's players were killed in the Munich air disaster while returning from a European Cup match in Belgrade the previous season; however, the Football League refused to allow the club to compete. As the draw had already been made for the preliminary round, Manchester United's drawn opponents, Young Boys, were given a bye to the first round of the competition. Instead, the two clubs played a pair of friendlies against each other, home and away; Young Boys won the first match 2–0 in Bern, but Manchester United won 3–0 at Old Trafford a week later. The two clubs were again drawn together in the group stage of both the 2018–19 and 2021–22 UEFA Champions League seasons, with the former happening almost exactly 60 years after they were originally due to play.

3 IFK Göteborg beat Jeunesse Esch 5–1 in a play-off to qualify for the first round.

4 Wismut Karl Marx Stadt beat Petrolul Ploieşti 4–0 in a play-off to qualify for the first round.

5 Schalke 04 beat KB 3–1 in a play-off to qualify for the first round.

First leg

Second leg

Standard Liège won 6–3 on aggregate

5–5 on aggregate

Play-off

Schalke 04 won play-off 3–1.

4–4 on aggregate

Play-off

Wismut Karl Marx Stadt won play-off 4–0.

2–2 on aggregate

Play-off

IFK Göteborg won play-off 5–1.

Stade Reims won 10–3 on aggregate

Wiener Sport-Club won 8–3 on aggregate

Dukla Prague won 4–3 on aggregate

Atlético Madrid won 13–1 on aggregate

MTK Budapest won 6–0 on aggregate

Sporting CP won 6–4 on aggregate

First round

|}

1 Atlético Madrid beat CSKA Sofia 3–1 in a playoff to qualify for the quarter-finals.

First leg

Second leg

Standard Liège won 6–2 on aggregate

Wismut Karl Marx Stadt won 6–2 on aggregate

Schalke 04 won 4–3 on aggregate

Wiener Sport-Club won 3–2 on aggregate

Young Boys won 6–2 on aggregate

2–2 on aggregate

Play-off

Atlético Madrid won play-off 3–1.

Real Madrid won 3–1 on aggregate

Reims won 7–0 on aggregate

Quarter-finals

|}
1 Young Boys beat Wismut Karl Marx Stadt 2–1 in a playoff to qualify for the semi-finals.

First leg

Second leg

Reims won 3–2 on aggregate

Atlético Madrid won 4–1 on aggregate

Real Madrid won 7–1 on aggregate

2–2 on aggregate

Play-off

Young Boys won play-off 2–1.

Semi-finals

|}
1 Real Madrid beat Atlético Madrid 2–1 in a playoff.

First leg

Second leg

2–2 on aggregate

Play-off

Real Madrid won play-off 2–1.

Reims won 3–1 on aggregate

Final

The 1959 European Cup Final was played on 3 June 1959 at the Neckarstadion in Stuttgart, West Germany. Real Madrid's victory was their fourth consecutive title, maintaining their status as the only team to have won the competition. Reims were runners-up for a second time, having already lost to Real in the inaugural final in 1956.

Top scorers
The top scorers from the 1958–59 European Cup were as follows:

References

External links

1958–59 All matches – season at UEFA website
European Cup results at Rec.Sport.Soccer Statistics Foundation
 All scorers 1958–59 European Cup (excluding preliminary round) according to protocols UEFA + all scorers preliminary round
1958-59 European Cup - results and line-ups (archive)

1958–59 in European football
European Champion Clubs' Cup seasons